Thomas Høgåsseter is a Norwegian shooter who won the 2014 and 2015 Norwegian National Cup of Stang and Field Rapid Shooting. He also has the official Mad minute World Record of 36 hits in one minute.

References 

Norwegian male sport shooters
Living people
Year of birth missing (living people)
Place of birth missing (living people)
21st-century Norwegian people